BSD/OS (originally called BSD/386 and sometimes known as BSDi) is a discontinued proprietary version of the BSD operating system developed by Berkeley Software Design, Inc. (BSDi).

BSD/OS had a reputation for reliability in server roles; the renowned Unix programmer and author W. Richard Stevens used it for his own personal web server.

History
BSDi was formed in 1991 by members of the Computer Systems Research Group (CSRG) at UC Berkeley to develop and sell a proprietary version of BSD Unix for PC compatible systems with Intel 386 (or later) processors. This made use of work previously done by Bill Jolitz to port BSD to the PC platform.

BSD/386 1.0 was released in March 1993. The company sold licenses and support for it, taking advantage of terms in the BSD License which permit use of the BSD software in proprietary systems, as long the author is credited. The company in turn contributed code and resources to the development of non-proprietary BSD operating systems. In the meantime, Jolitz had left BSDi and independently released an open source BSD for PCs, called 386BSD. The BSDi system features complete and thorough manpage documentation for the entire system, including complete syntax and argument explanations, examples, file usage, authors, and cross-references to other commands.

BSD/386 licenses (including source code) were priced at $995, lower than AT&T UNIX System V source licenses, a fact highlighted in their advertisements.  As part of the settlement of USL v. BSDi, BSDI substituted code that had been written for the University's 4.4 BSD-Lite release for disputed code in their OS, effective with release 2.0. By the time of this release, the "386" designation had become dated, and BSD/386 was renamed "BSD/OS". Later releases of BSD/OS also support Sun SPARC-based systems. BSD/OS 5.x versions are available for PowerPC too.

The marketing of BSD/OS became increasingly focused on Internet server applications. However, the increasingly tight market for Unix-compatible software in the late 1990s and early 2000s hurt sales of BSD/OS. On one end of the market, it lacked the certification of the Open Group to bear the UNIX trademark, and the sales force and hardware support of the larger Unix vendors. Simultaneously, it lacked the negligible acquisition cost of the open source BSDs and Linux. BSD/OS was acquired by Wind River Systems in April 2001. Wind River discontinued sales of BSD/OS at the end of 2003, with support terminated at the end of 2004.

Releases

References

Berkeley Software Distribution
Discontinued operating systems